Kurt Einberger (born January 27, 1966 in Brixlegg) is an Austrian bobsledder who competed in the 1990s. Competing in two Winter Olympics, he earned his best finish of sixth in the four-man event at Lillehammer in 1994.

References
 1994 bobsleigh two-man results
 1994 bobsleigh four-man results
 1998 bobsleigh four-man results

1966 births
Austrian male bobsledders
Bobsledders at the 1994 Winter Olympics
Bobsledders at the 1998 Winter Olympics
Living people
Olympic bobsledders of Austria